The Web of Deceit is a 1920 American silent drama film directed by Edwin Carewe and starring Hugh Cameron, Dolores Cassinelli and Lettie Ford.

Cast
 Hugh Cameron as Red Smith 
 Dolores Cassinelli as Wanda Hubbard / Lucille Hubbard 
 Lettie Ford as Emily Ann Hubbard 
 Franklyn Hanna as Major Andrew Clarke 
 Mitchell Harris as Roger Burney

References

Bibliography
 Lowe, Denise. An Encyclopedic Dictionary of Women in Early American Films: 1895-1930. Routledge, 2014.

External links

1920 films
1920 drama films
Silent American drama films
Films directed by Edwin Carewe
American silent feature films
1920s English-language films
Pathé Exchange films
American black-and-white films
1920s American films